The alternative Christmas message is a message broadcast by Channel 4 since 1993, as a sometimes humorous and sometimes serious alternative to the traditional Royal Christmas Message.

Background
Beginning in 1993, Channel 4 broadcast an "alternative Christmas message", usually featuring a contemporary, often controversial celebrity delivering a message in the manner of Queen Elizabeth II. This tradition started by accident when, running a series of programmes on "Christmas in New York", the channel invited Quentin Crisp (who, coincidentally, was born on Christmas Day) to give an alternative message – playing on the pejorative term 'queen' meaning a very feminine male homosexual. In contrast to the Queen's message, the alternative lasts only three to five minutes. The concept seems to date back to a sketch in a Christmas special of The Two Ronnies, where Ronnie Barker delivered a Christmas message from "Your Local Milkman". Examples of recent variations to the alternative Christmas message proliferate on YouTube.

Messages

1990s

2000s

2010s

2020s

See also
 Prime Minister's New Year Message (United Kingdom)

References

1993 British television series debuts
2000s British television series
2010s British television series
2020s British television series
British monarchy
Channel 4 original programming
Christmas in the United Kingdom
Speeches